In the three elections, following the 2007 municipal reform, that had been held prior to this election, Venstre had ended up with the mayor position. In the 2017 Vejle municipal election, the parties of the traditional blue bloc had won 16 seats against 15 for the traditional red bloc. Therefore, this election was seen as a "thriller".

Jens Ejner Christensen from Venstre was seeking a second term, while Martin Sikær would be the candidate for the Social Democrats.

Despite that the Social Democrats were given a fair chance to win the mayor's position, the results ended in favor of the blue bloc. Venstre would win 2 seats, while the Social Democrats would lose 2, which meant they would lose the position as the biggest party in the council. It was later confirmed that Jens Ejner Christensen would conitnue as mayor.

Electoral system
For elections to Danish municipalities, a number varying from 9 to 31 are chosen to be elected to the municipal council. The seats are then allocated using the D'Hondt method and a closed list proportional representation.
Vejle Municipality had 31 seats in 2021

Unlike in Danish General Elections, in elections to municipal councils, electoral alliances are allowed.

Electoral alliances  

Electoral Alliance 1

Electoral Alliance 2

Electoral Alliance 3

Electoral Alliance 4

Results

Notes

References 

Vejle